The Oerlikon KCA is a Swiss  gas-operated single-barrel revolver cannon developed for aircraft use. Its most noticeable use was on the JA 37 Viggen fighter mounted in a conformal pod as the akan m/75. The KCA fires a  shell that is 50% heavier than the NATO standard ammunition used on ADEN and DEFA cannon. It can fire up to 1350 rounds per minute at a muzzle velocity of 1030 m/s, with an effective range of

References

Oerlikon-Contraves
30 mm artillery
Autocannon
Aircraft guns